Baba Bahram (also Romanized as Bābā Bahrām) is a village in Malavi Rural District, in the Central District of Pol-e Dokhtar County, Lorestan Province, Iran. At the 2006 census, its population was 109, in 26 families.

References 

Towns and villages in Pol-e Dokhtar County